Evolutionary Bioinformatics is a peer-reviewed open access scientific journal focusing on computational biology in the study of evolution. The journal was established in 2005 by Allen Rodrigo and is currently edited by Dennis Wall (Stanford University). It was originally published by Libertas Academica, but SAGE Publications became the publisher in September 2016.

Abstracting and indexing 
The journal is abstracted and indexed in:

According to the Journal Citation Reports, the journal has a 2013 impact factor of 1.169.

References

External links
 

Publications established in 2005
Biology journals
Open access journals
SAGE Publishing academic journals
English-language journals